Stereochilus is the scientific name of two genera of organisms and may refer to:

Stereochilus (amphibian), a genus of salamanders in the family Plethodontidae
Stereochilus (plant), a genus of plants in the family Orchidaceae